Barry Alexander Anthony Wood (13 June 1942 – 2 May 2017) was a Roman Catholic bishop from South Africa.

Ordained to the priesthood in 1968, Wood served as titular bishop of Babra and auxiliary bishop of the Roman Catholic bishop of the Roman Catholic Archdiocese of Durban from 2005 until his death in 2017.

Notes

1942 births
2017 deaths
21st-century Roman Catholic bishops in South Africa
Roman Catholic bishops of Durban